The 1984 All-SEC football team consists of American football players selected to the All-Southeastern Conference (SEC) chosen by various selectors for the 1984 NCAA Division I-A football season. Florida won the conference, though it was later vacated.

Offensive selections

Receivers 

 Chuck Scott, Vanderbilt (AP-1, UPI)
Eric Martin, LSU (AP-2, UPI)
Tim McGee, Tennessee (AP-2)

Tight ends 
 Jim Popp, Vanderbilt (AP-1)
 Jeff Parks, Auburn (AP-2)

Tackles
Lomas Brown, Florida (AP-1, UPI)
Lance Smith, LSU (AP-1, UPI)
Rob Monaco, Vanderbilt (AP-2)
Crawford Ker, Florida (AP-2)

Guards 
Bill Mayo, Tennessee (AP-1, UPI)
Jeff Lott, Auburn (AP-1)
Jeff Zimmerman, Florida (AP-2)
Danny Sanders, Miss. St. (AP-2)
Peter Anderson, Georgia (AP-2)

Centers 
Phil Bromley, Florida (AP-1, UPI)
Wes Neighbors, Alabama (AP-2)

Quarterbacks 

 Tony Robinson, Tennessee (AP-1)
 Kurt Page, Vanderbilt (UPI)
 Kerwin Bell, Florida (AP-2)

Running backs 

 Johnnie Jones, Tennessee (AP-1, UPI)
Dalton Hilliard, LSU (AP-1, UPI)
George Adams, Kentucky (AP-1, UPI)
Neal Anderson, Florida (AP-2)
John L. Williams, Florida (AP-2)

Defensive selections

Ends
Gerald Robinson, Auburn (AP-1, UPI)
 Freddie Joe Nunn, Ole Miss (AP-1, UPI)
Tim Newton, Florida (UPI)
Michael Brooks, LSU (AP-2)
Kenny Sims, Georgia (AP-2)

Tackles 
Jon Hand, Alabama (AP-1, UPI)
Pat Swoopes, Miss. St. (AP-2, UPI)
Ben Thomas, Auburn (AP-1)
Karl Jordan, Vanderbilt (AP-2)

Linebackers 
 Gregg Carr, Auburn (AP-1, UPI)
Alonzo Johnson, Florida (AP-1, UPI)
 Knox Culpepper, Georgia (AP-1, UPI)
 Cornelius Bennett, Alabama (AP-1)
 Shawn Burks, LSU (AP-2)
 Cam Jacobs, Kentucky (AP-2)
 Aaron Pearson, Miss. St. (AP-2)

Backs 
Jeff Sanchez, Georgia (AP-1, UPI)
Paul Calhoun, Kentucky (AP-1, UPI)
Liffort Hobley, LSU (AP-1, UPI)
David King, Auburn (AP-2, UPI)
Manuel Young, Vanderbilt (AP-2)
Jeffery Dale, LSU (AP-2)

Special teams

Kicker 
Kevin Butler, Georgia (AP-1, UPI)
Fuad Reveiz, Tennessee (AP-2)

Punter 

 Ricky Anderson, Vanderbilt (AP-1, UPI)
 Bill Smith, Ole Miss (AP-2)

Key
AP = Associated Press

UPI = United Press International

Bold = Consensus first-team selection by both AP and UPI

See also
1984 College Football All-America Team

References

All-SEC
All-SEC football teams